Kirill Akopovich Grigoryan (born 2 April 1992) is a Russian shooter. He represented his country at the 2016 Summer Olympics, where he won the bronze medal in the 50 metre rifle prone event.

References 

1992 births
Living people
Russian sportspeople of Armenian descent
Russian male sport shooters
Shooters at the 2016 Summer Olympics
Olympic shooters of Russia
Olympic bronze medalists for Russia
Olympic medalists in shooting
Medalists at the 2016 Summer Olympics
Shooters at the 2019 European Games
European Games bronze medalists for Russia
European Games medalists in shooting
Universiade medalists in shooting
Universiade gold medalists for Russia
Universiade silver medalists for Russia
Universiade bronze medalists for Russia
Medalists at the 2015 Summer Universiade